Clara Alonso may refer to:

 Clara Alonso (model) (born 1987), Spanish model
 Clara Alonso (actress) (born 1990), Argentine actress and singer